Abdul Hafiz (born 6 November 1957) is a retired lieutenant general of the Bangladesh Army. He was Chief of General Staff, Bangladesh Army. He served as the Force Commander in UN peacekeeping mission in Western Sahara and Côte d'Ivoire.

Personal life and education 
He was born on 6 November 1957. Hafiz is the father of two daughters. He completed his master's degree in defense studies from Bangladesh National University. He completed a course on small and heavy arms of infantry in China and Advanced Infantry Officer's course in the United States of America. He was also graduated from the Defense Intelligence College of France. He can speak in English and French.

Career

In Bangladesh Army 
Abdul Hafiz joined the infantry corps as an officer on 8 May 1977. In 2005, he became major general of the Bangladesh Army. He retired from Bangladesh Army shortly after being promoted to lieutenant general.

He became commander of an infantry brigade in 1999. He was commandant of the Bangladesh Military Academy from 2001 to 2003. He also commanded 33rd Infantry Division in Comilla from 2005 to 2008. Then he served as the Director-General of Ansar and VDP, a paramilitary organization from 2008 to 2009. He served as the Chief of General Staff in Bangladesh Army.

In UN peacekeeping 
General Hafiz was military liaison officer of UNIKOM in Zagreb from 1991 to 1992.

He participated a seminar on the Operations of Peacekeeping Nations held at the Staff College, Camberley in October 1994. In 2006, he attended the 11th Committee on Defense Forum held in Tokyo.

UN mission in Côte d'Ivoire 
Hafiz was the chief military liaison officer of United Nations Mission in Côte d'Ivoire (MINUCI) from 2003 to 2004. After then, he served as the Deputy Force Commander of United Nations Operation in Côte d'Ivoire (UNOCI) from 2004 to 2005.

In his second mission in Côte d'Ivoire, he has appointed as Force Commander of UNOCI in 2010. He resigned from the post on 22 March 2011 after being accused of releasing secret information to a documentary director. The documentary highlights French interest in its African territory and its war. In his resignation speech, Hafiz said,

UN mission in Western Sahara 
After Côte d'Ivoire mission, again General Hafiz was appointed as the Force Commander of the United Nations Mission for the Referendum in Western Sahara on 23 July 2011. Ban Ki-Moon stated in appointing him, 

He was highly appreciated on his tour of MINURSO. On the end of the tour, the official statement was, “The Secretary-General Ban Ki-moon is grateful to Major General Hafiz for his exemplary service and contribution to the work of MINURSO since July 2011.”

Award 
Abdul Hafiz received many awards in his distinguished career. He was awarded the United Nations Medal for his service in MINURSO.

References

External links
Interview of Abdul Hafiz, Voice of America, 30 July 2011

1957 births
Living people
Bangladesh Army generals
United Nations military personnel
National University, Bangladesh alumni
Bangladeshi generals
Rajshahi Cadet College alumni